Epalpodes is a genus of parasitic flies in the family Tachinidae. There are about six described species in Epalpodes.

Species
These six species belong to the genus Epalpodes:
 Epalpodes aequatorialis Townsend
 Epalpodes albolineatus (Macquart, 1855)
 Epalpodes chillanensis Cortes, 1951
 Epalpodes equatoralis (Macquart, 1854)
 Epalpodes equatorialis Townsend, 1912
 Epalpodes malloi Cortes & Campos, 1971

References

Further reading

 
 
 
 

Tachinidae
Articles created by Qbugbot